Stoughtonham Furnace Site is the site of a colonial-era iron foundry in Foxborough and Sharon, Massachusetts.  First established in the 1760s, the site drew the attention of artillery colonel Richard Gridley following the outbreak of the American Revolutionary War in 1775.  Gridley and some business partners acquired the property, and the foundry produced cannons and ammunition for the Continental Army throughout the war.

The site, located in the Gavin's Pond area near the Foxborough line, was added to the National Register of Historic Places in 1984.

See also
National Register of Historic Places listings in Norfolk County, Massachusetts

References

Archaeological sites on the National Register of Historic Places in Massachusetts
National Register of Historic Places in Norfolk County, Massachusetts
Sharon, Massachusetts
Buildings and structures in Foxborough, Massachusetts